Ross Lee Chastain (born December 4, 1992) is an American professional stock car racing driver. He competes full-time in the NASCAR Cup Series, driving the No. 1 Chevrolet Camaro ZL1 for Trackhouse Racing Team, part-time in the NASCAR Xfinity Series, driving the No. 91 Chevrolet Camaro for DGM Racing, and part-time in the NASCAR Craftsman Truck Series, driving the No. 41 Chevrolet Silverado for Niece Motorsports. He is the older brother of NASCAR Camping World Truck Series driver Chad Chastain.

Early career
Chastain started racing at the age of twelve, his interest piqued by his father's hobby racing and other kids his age racing. His home track was Punta Gorda Speedway in Punta Gorda, Florida, at age twelve, competing in both late model and Fastruck Series events. Even those races, at tracks like Citrus County Speedway, Auburndale Speedway and DeSoto Speedway, were run on a tight budget, a theme that would carry on to much of Chastain's career in the higher ranks of NASCAR.  His short track career saw Chastain scoring over fifty wins in feature events, including the Limited Late Model portion of the 2011 World Series Of Asphalt Stock Car Racing at New Smyrna Speedway, winning three of eight events in the series.

NASCAR

After making the move to Charlotte in mid-2011, Chastain took over the No. 66 Turn One Racing entry in the NASCAR Camping World Truck Series after Justin Marks vacated the seat. His first Truck race, at Lucas Oil Raceway at Indianapolis, was his first race with live pit stops. He finished 10th in that event. Connections in the watermelon farming industry got Chastain four more races, which were marred by incidents at Bristol Motor Speedway and Kentucky Speedway. At Homestead-Miami Speedway, rain prevented the Turn One team from making the race, so the team bought an RSS Racing start and park entry and ran the full race, finishing two laps down.  It was later announced that Chastain would compete for Rookie of the Year honors with SS-Green Light Racing in 2012. Driving the No. 08 truck sponsored by the National Watermelon Association and National Watermelon Promotion Board, he scored a career-best finish of seventh in the second race of the season at Martinsville Speedway. He bested his 7th-place finish with a 3rd-place finish at Bristol in August.

In January 2013, it was announced that Chastain would drive in 15 Camping World Truck Series races in 2013 for Brad Keselowski Racing. At Iowa Speedway in September, Chastain won his first career Truck Series pole for the Fan Appreciation 200; he led the most laps in the race, finishing second to James Buescher as the race underwent a green-white-checkered finish. Chastain also came close to the win at the penultimate race at Phoenix, finishing second to Erik Jones after leading over 60 laps. Years later, Chastain said that he initially made the move to BKR as an attempt to get in a Team Penske ride, but that BKR and Penske did not view the situation that way.

2014–2016
Leaving BKR after the 2013 season, Chastain moved to RBR Enterprises for a part-time schedule in the NASCAR Camping World Truck Series for 2014. Comments before and after the Martinsville race, as well as racing actions during the race, led the team to fire Chastain from the ride. In May, he announced he would make his debut in the Nationwide Series (now Xfinity Series) at Charlotte Motor Speedway, driving the No. 55 for Viva Motorsports. Chastain later drove for Hattori Racing Enterprises at Michigan International Speedway, replacing Johnny Sauter. If that opportunity did not arise, Chastain was set to replace another driver that weekend, John Wes Townley in the No. 5 Wauters Motorsports truck at Gateway Motorsports Park. In the race with HRE, Chastain finished twelfth, which was to that point the team's best finish in NASCAR competition. The finish eventually turned into more sporadic appearances with HRE throughout the rest of the season. Chastain also joined the team for a part-time NASCAR K&N Pro Series East effort that year.

He then joined JD Motorsports in 2015, replacing Jeffrey Earnhardt. The opportunity emerged after Chastain raced with TriStar Motorsports at the end of the 2014 season. His car was comparable to the performances of the JDM cars, which led to a deal in the offseason. Chastain logged four top-tens on the year, ninth in the season-opening PowerShares QQQ 300, tenth at the other Daytona race, tenth at Iowa, and tenth at Darlington, and got into an altercation with Ryan Reed after a race at Richmond International Raceway. Reed claimed Chastain made too much contact on late restarts and vowed payback, while Chastain simply brushed the incident off as a difference of opinions in short-track racing.

2017

Chastain's 2017 Xfinity season was the best of his career, scoring a top-five at Iowa and two top tens as well as finishing 13th in points, the highest of the non-playoff drivers. He achieved this after a tight points battle with J. J. Yeley for the spot in the last four races of the season. In the second half of the season, Chastain rarely finished outside the top twenty and mainly finished in the mid-teens.

The season was marred by two fights with fellow Xfinity drivers, one with Jeremy Clements at Bristol after Clements confronted him and one with Brendan Gaughan at Texas after heated on-track competition. Chastain, Gaughan, and crew members from both teams brawled behind Victory Lane after the night race. A crew member from JD Motorsports teammate Garrett Smithley was taken to the hospital with a head injury after the fight. Chastain blamed the confrontation on Gaughan, saying the Richard Childress Racing driver attacked him, but also acknowledged that he races hard and does not play favorites. Gaughan initially avoided discussing the incident with reporters but later boasted about the incident on SiriusXM NASCAR Radio and said that he received several text messages from fellow drivers who were happy about the incident. He did admit that he could've handled the situation later but didn't care about it. That opinion was likely influenced by the fact that 2017 was Gaughan's final Xfinity season, as any retaliation would have to happen within the next two races.

In 2017, Chastain joined Premium Motorsports' No. 15 car for his Monster Energy NASCAR Cup Series debut in the AAA 400 Drive for Autism at Dover, an opportunity he initially resisted after being informed of the opportunity by Xfinity team owner Johnny Davis. he finished 20th. Chastain heard from various sources that his driving style made multiple drivers mad on-track, but Chastain says it doesn't bother him. He also drove the No. 15 at the fall Dover race, finishing 38th. Chastain was originally on the entry list to drive the No. 7 car, the second car for Premium Motorsports, at the Cup series season finale at Homestead, but the team withdrew.

2018
In late September 2017, Chastain announced that he would return to JD Motorsports for a fourth year, running the entire 2018 NASCAR Xfinity Series season, as well as hinting at another part-time Cup schedule with Premium Motorsports. He started off the Xfinity season with a top-ten at Daytona International Speedway, and ran his first Cup race of 2018 the week after at Atlanta Motor Speedway. By the Easter off weekend, Chastain had expanded his Cup schedule, which had included every race since Atlanta, to all of the race weekends where the Monster Energy NASCAR Cup Series and NASCAR Xfinity Series run at the same track. Chastain also returned to the truck series at Iowa on an off week for the Cup Series and a companion race with the Xfinity Series, driving the No. 50 truck for Beaver Motorsports. He continued to run most of the Cup schedule, running the entirety of the summer schedule save for the Sonoma Raceway event, where Justin Marks drove. Chastain tied his career-best finish Xfinity Series finish at Iowa Speedway, avoiding last-lap chaos to bring home another fourth-place finish. At the Xfinity Series race at Mid-Ohio, Chastain and Joey Gase made contact multiple times on the final lap, eventually leading Gase to spin off track. On pit road after the race, Gase swerved his car toward Chastain with spectators and crew members in the vicinity. The two later had a shouting match and Gase was tackled by one of Chastain's crew members. After a trip to the NASCAR hauler, Gase called Chastain a "golden boy" and threatened to derail Chastain's playoff hopes. Chastain hopped in the Premium Motorsports No. 15 truck for the World of Westgate 200 and finished seventh, Premium's best-ever finish across all three NASCAR national series.

On the strength of a summer performance that saw him hold down the final Xfinity Series playoff spot, Chastain and Chip Ganassi Racing announced a three-race agreement for Chastain to pilot the organization's No. 42 entry for races at Darlington Raceway, Las Vegas Motor Speedway and Richmond Raceway. The races came at the expense of John Hunter Nemechek, who could not sell sponsorship for the races. DC Solar was announced as a backer for Chastain's effort. Chastain had previously met the CEO of DC Solar at Auto Club Speedway in 2018, and plans materialized from there. For the first race of the trio, Chastain held top-ten spots in both practices, finishing second in first practice. He later claimed the pole over Christopher Bell, and during the race won the first two stages. During the third stage, Chastain was battling for the race lead with Kevin Harvick with thirty-five laps to go. Through turns one and two of the traditionally one-groove Darlington track, the lapped car of Chad Finchum took the top-groove racing lane, leaving Harvick and Chastain jostling for positions in the bottom lanes. After clearing Finchum, Harvick slid up into Chastain who then slid up into the wall. On the backstretch, Chastain hooked Harvick's machine into the outside wall, ending Harvick's day. Harvick later parked in Chastain's pit stall before giving a heated post-race interview calling Chastain "inexperienced" and saying that Chastain will "never get to drive many of them [events in top-tier cars] again. Chip Ganassi then responded on Twitter, defending Chastain's performance and stating that he "helped himself to many future opportunities"." Chastain, for his part, finished 25th after repairs and called running up front "cool" and also saying "I don't care what Harvick says."

After running a race with JD Motorsports at Indianapolis, Chastain returned to CGR for the DC Solar 300 at Las Vegas Motor Speedway. He once again performed well throughout the weekend, securing the second-fastest time in final practice and the fifth starting spot for the race. Once again the class of the field, Chastain led all but twenty of the 200 laps in the race and prevailed over Justin Allgaier for the victory, his first in over 200 starts in NASCAR. True to his roots, Chastain smashed a watermelon on the track as a final victory celebration.  In a post-race media conference, he admitted to getting emotional in the closing laps of the race due to the gravity of the win. With the win, a playoff berth was wrapped up, the first of his career. Chastain also revealed that he was not being paid to drive the car, something that he claimed was reason for ridicule within the sport. Chastain fell out of the playoffs after the opening round after Matt Tifft made a late-race rally at Dover, claiming the final spot by three points.

Towards the latter part of the 2018 season, Chastain joined Niece Motorsports for some NASCAR Camping World Truck Series races. Although some were surprised at how well Chastain ran in those races, Chastain instead said that the organization was better than the community gave it credit for.

2019

On October 6, 2018, it was reported that Chastain had agreed to drive the 2019 Monster Energy NASCAR Cup Series season with Premium Motorsports, and a deal with Chip Ganassi Racing for more Xfinity races was likely. On November 9, 2018, Chastain and CGR announced a full season in the No. 42 Xfinity Series car for 2019. DC Solar, instrumental in Chastain's introduction to the team, remained on as sponsor. However, after DC Solar was raided by the FBI on December 18, 2018, the team lost the sponsorship and shut down in January.

In January 2019, Chastain joined Niece Motorsports to drive the No. 45 Silverado part-time in the Truck Series, splitting the truck with Reid Wilson. On January 31, Chastain announced he would return to the No. 4 JD Motorsports ride for 30 races, replacing Blake Koch, who stepped away to focus on business ventures. For the other three races of the schedule – Daytona in February, Chicagoland in June, and Texas in November – Chastain announced he would join Kaulig Racing, driving the organization's No. 10 entry. In his first race with Niece, Chastain began the season with a third-place finish in the 2019 NextEra Energy 250. At his first ever Daytona 500, Chastain scored his first career top-ten in the Cup Series despite starting 36th in the race.

During the spring, Chastain broke the all-time NASCAR record for most consecutive races run across all three national series to start a season, surpassing the mark of 22 set by Kyle Busch set in 2008.

On May 10, 2019, Chastain won his first career NASCAR Gander Outdoors Truck Series race in the 2019 Digital Ally 250 at Kansas Speedway. He nearly spun out with 20 laps to go but saved the truck, later inheriting the lead from Stewart Friesen after he ran out of fuel. In June, he announced his intention to switch to Truck Series points to compete for a championship in the series.

In June's M&M's 200 at Iowa, Chastain led 141 of 200 laps and swept the stages to score the win, but his truck failed post-race inspection and his victory was forfeited to Brett Moffitt under NASCAR's newly-introduced disqualification policy. Chastain was the first driver to have a win revoked since Dale Jarrett was disqualified from a Busch Series race in 1995, relegated to last in the official standings. Chastain's team appealed the penalty, though it was eventually upheld after a hearing with National Motorsports Appeals panelist Bryan Moss. He earned redemption the following week in Gateway's CarShield 200, however, leading 21 laps and scoring the victory after taking only fuel and no tires on his final pit stop.

Chastain won the 2019 Circle K Firecracker 250 at Daytona driving the No. 16 Camaro for Kaulig Racing. Chastain's teammates Justin Haley and A. J. Allmendinger finished behind him, though Allmendinger was subsequently disqualified for failing post-race inspection. Chastain would later win at Pocono Raceway in the Truck Series in commanding fashion, dedicating his win to Kaulig crew chief Nick Harrison, who had died the previous week. In Xfinity Series competition at Watkins Glen International, Chastain sent Justin Allgaier spinning off the track in the bus stop portion of the circuit; Allgaier, thinking the move was intentional, wrecked Chastain in the same section of the track later in the race, relegating Chastain to a 34th-place finish. Chastain chalked his side of the incidents up to mistakes while Allgaier cited instances of Daytona earlier in 2018 and Las Vegas in 2018 as further dirty racing by Chastain. Once Chastain's berth in the Truck Series playoffs was secure, CarShield announced full sponsorship of his playoff efforts.

Chastain would earn his second top-five of 2019 when he finished second to Christopher Bell at Texas Motor Speedway in November, leading 29 laps.

2020

On October 15, 2019, it was announced that Chastain would be driving for Kaulig Racing full-time in the 2020 NASCAR Xfinity Series. Chastain also returned to the Cup Series at the Daytona 500 and Coca-Cola 600, driving the No. 77 in a partnership between Chip Ganassi Racing and Spire Motorsports. He also retained his ride with Niece Motorsports in the Truck Series in a part-time capacity, moving over to the organization's No. 44 entry and sharing the ride with Carson Hocevar and Natalie Decker.

Chastain failed to qualify for the Xfinity season opener at Daytona after mechanical issues plagued his car. However, Kaulig and RSS Racing forged an agreement that RSS driver Jeff Green surrender his No. 38 car to Chastain for the race. In the Daytona 500, Chastain was involved in a late wreck with Ryan Preece that took him out of the race.

On February 19, 2020, Roush Fenway Racing announced Chastain would replace an injured Ryan Newman in the team's No. 6 Ford starting with the Pennzoil 400 at Las Vegas. Chastain drove the No. 6 for three races before the season was put on hold due to the COVID-19 pandemic. Newman returned to the No. 6 when the season resumed while Chastain returned to Spire Motorsports part-time.

On September 21, 2020, Chip Ganassi Racing announced that Chastain would replace Matt Kenseth in the No. 42 Chevrolet in 2021. He finished a career-high 7th in the Xfinity standings with 27 top tens (the most of any driver that season) and 15 top fives (including five runner-up finishes), despite not winning a race.

2021

Chastain's Cup tenure with Ganassi began with a seventh-place finish in the 2021 Daytona 500, his best Cup finish up to that point. During the race's rain delay, he became the subject of a viral video from CGR in which he ordered food at a McDonald's (a team sponsor) drive-through for the team.

In March, Chastain rejoined Niece for the Truck race at Atlanta. In May, he reunited with SS-Green Light Racing to drive their No. 07 car in the Xfinity Series race at Circuit of the Americas, replacing its normal driver, Joe Graf Jr.

On June 30, 2021, Justin Marks, co-founder of Trackhouse Racing Team announced that he had purchased Chip Ganassi Racing's entire NASCAR operations after the 2021 season, leaving Chastain as a free agent. On August 3, 2021, it was revealed that Chastain would drive the No. 1 Chevrolet Camaro ZL1 for Trackhouse Racing's upcoming second Cup team, alongside the No. 99  of Daniel Suárez, in a multi-year deal beginning in 2022.

2022

Chastain began the 2022 season with a 40th place finish at the 2022 Daytona 500 and a 29th place finish at Auto Club Speedway. He then rebounded with a third place finish, while leading an at the time, career-high 83 laps at Las Vegas Motor Speedway and two runner-up finishes at Phoenix Raceway, and at Atlanta Motor Speedway, after recovering a two lap deficit upon crashing in lead position. Chastain scored his first career cup win at the Circuit of the Americas battling against Alex Bowman and A. J. Allmendinger.  A month later, he claimed his second victory at Talladega. At the 2022 NASCAR All-Star Race, Chastain finished 22nd after going airborne from colliding with Kyle Busch, taking Chase Elliott out in the process. At the Indianapolis road course, Chastain crossed the line second to Tyler Reddick, but was penalized and scored 27th place for crossing the access road during the final restart. He finished third at the Phoenix finale and a career-best second place in the points standings.

Feud with Denny Hamlin
In June at Gateway, Chastain began a feud with Hamlin. Early in the race, Chastain ran into Hamlin's back bumper, causing Hamlin to spin and sustain damage to his car. Fifteen laps later, Hamlin attempted to slow Chastain by blocking him at a slower-than-normal rate of speed. NASCAR intervened and told Hamlin that he "had made his point." Later in the same race, Chastain ran into Chase Elliott, causing him to spin. At the restart, Elliott pushed Chastain towards the wall while Hamlin made a tight pass to once again express his frustration. Chastain accepted fault for the incidents saying, "I just drove over my head so many times".

Weeks later at Atlanta, Chastain spun Hamlin with 14 laps to go. This caused Hamlin, who was running in the top-five, to fall to the back of the pack. Hamlin said that he had "reached his peak" when referring to dealing with Chastain.

"GameCube" wall-ride maneuver / "The Hail Melon"
Chastain set a record for the fastest lap during a NASCAR Cup Series race for the track. He was retroactively credited with a fourth-place finish after Brad Keselowski was disqualified.

The "wall-riding" move was widely commented upon in the media. Chastain said that the move was inspired by the video game NASCAR 2005 on the GameCube. Overtaken rival Hamlin described it as a "great move", adding that "when you have no other choice, it certainly is easy to do that." Although NASCAR ruled the maneuver legal, some race competitors and commentators criticized the move's safety and called on NASCAR to prohibit the move from setting a precedent at future races. A rule change on January 31, 2023 officially made such moves illegal and subject to a time penalty.

Within days, footage of the move received more than 100 million views on Twitter and other social media.

At Phoenix, Chastain finished third in the Cup Championship race to finish a career-best second in the points standings.

Personal life
A native of Alva, Florida, Chastain was a watermelon farmer on his family's farm until he turned thirteen. He is a graduate of Riverdale High School in Fort Myers. Chastain attended Florida Gulf Coast University for a semester before he began racing in the Truck Series.

While Chastain's father raced as a hobby, Ross is the first generation of his family to race competitively. Ross started racing at age twelve after seeing his father hobby race and seeing other kids his age race. Ross is the older brother of Chad Chastain.

Motorsports pundits and fans have come up with a variety of rhyming monikers for Chastain, such as Ross "The Hoss" and Ross "The Boss."

Motorsports career results

Stock car career summary

† As Chastain was a guest driver, he was ineligible for championship points.

NASCAR
(key) (Bold – Pole position awarded by qualifying time. Italics – Pole position earned by points standings or practice time. * – Most laps led.)

Cup Series

Daytona 500

Xfinity Series

Craftsman Truck Series

 Season still in progress
 Ineligible for series points
 Chastain began the 2019 season racing for Xfinity Series points but switched to Truck Series points before the SpeedyCash.com 400 at Texas.

K&N Pro Series East

References

External links

 
 

NASCAR drivers
Racing drivers from Florida
Farmers from Florida
People from Lee County, Florida
1992 births
Living people
RFK Racing drivers
Chip Ganassi Racing drivers